Sib Chal (also Romanized as Sīb Chāl) is a village in Cheshmeh Saran Rural District, Cheshmeh Saran District, Azadshahr County, Golestan Province, Iran. At the 2006 census, its population was 485, in 99 families.

References 

Populated places in Azadshahr County